is a Japanese former swimmer. He competed in the men's 1500 metre freestyle at the 1964 Summer Olympics.

References

External links
 

1946 births
Living people
Olympic swimmers of Japan
Swimmers at the 1964 Summer Olympics
Place of birth missing (living people)
Japanese male freestyle swimmers
Universiade medalists in swimming
Universiade bronze medalists for Japan
Medalists at the 1965 Summer Universiade
20th-century Japanese people